Idha Anna Maria Övelius (born 22 May 1972, Södertälje, Sweden), known professionally as Idha, is a Swedish singer/songwriter. She released two albums in the 1990s on Creation Records: Melody Inn and Troublemaker.

Idha was married to guitarist Andy Bell, co-founder of Ride and former bassist of Oasis, with whom she had two children, a daughter named Leia and a son named Leon. Bell co-wrote some of the songs on her debut album, Melody Inn, while former Small Faces member Ian McLagan contributed keyboards to the album. Her 1994 EP A Woman in a Man's World featured guest appearances from both Evan Dando and Stephen Duffy.

After a quiet couple of years, Idha returned in 1997 with her second album Troublemaker, again featuring Bell, alongside Tony Barber (of Buzzcocks) and Alan White. While her first album largely consisted of country-tinged, acoustic folk-rock, the second had a much fuller sound with the addition of horns and strings.

Idha lives in Stockholm, Sweden with her two children. She retired from the music industry in 2000. Since 2009 she has been working as a structural engineer at Stockholm based firm Hidemark & Stintzing Architects.

Discography

Albums
Melody Inn (1994) Creation
Troublemaker (1997) Creation

Singles
"Get Undressed" (1994) Creation
A Woman in a Man's World EP (1994) Creation
"Sorry Sorry" (1997) Creation
"Going Down South" (1997) Creation
"Sweet September Rain" (1997) Creation

References

External links
 [ Idha at the AllMusic guide]
Robbins, Ira "Idha - Melody Inn review", Trouser Press

1972 births
Living people
People from Södertälje
21st-century Swedish singers
21st-century Swedish women singers